Tatyana Olegovna Shaposhnikova (born 1946) is a Russian-born Swedish mathematician. She is best known for her work in the theory of multipliers in function spaces,  partial differential operators and history of mathematics, some of which was partly done jointly with Vladimir Maz'ya. She is also a translator of both scientific and literary texts.

Biography

Academic career
T.O. Shaposhnikova graduated from Leningrad University in 1969. From 1969 to 1972 she was a graduate student at the same university. In 1973 she was awarded the Kandidat Nauk degree. From 1973 to 1990 she worked in the mathematics departments of a number of technical institutes in Leningrad, first as an assistant and then as an associate professor. She lost her job twice because of her contacts with active dissidents, thus having to change her employer. She immigrated in Sweden in 1990 with her family. She has worked as associate professor (universitetslektor) at the Department of Mathematics of the University of Linköping from 1 July 1991 to September 2013, and held a position of full professor at the Department of Mathematics of the Ohio State University, from 2004 to 2008: in 2013-2018 she held a part-time job at the Department of Mathematics at the Royal Institute of Technology.

In 2010-2016 she served as a member of the European Mathematical Society Ethics Committee: currently she serves as a member of the editorial boards of the journal Complex variable and Elliptic Equations and of the Eurasian Mathematical Journal.

Honors
In March 2003 Shaposhnikova and Vladimir Maz'ya were awarded the Verdaguer Prize by the French Academy of Sciences for their work resulting in the first scientific biography of Jacques Hadamard. In May 2010 she was awarded the Thureus prize by the Royal Society of Sciences in Uppsala "for her outstanding contribution to the theory of partial differential equations and in particular to the theory of multipliers in function spaces".

Work

Research activity
Shaposhnikova is the author of more than 70 research papers and of four books: her research mainly belongs to the following fields.

Function spaces
From 1979 on, the theory of multipliers in various spaces of differentiable functions has been the main research theme of her work. She found conditions for the boundedness of singular integrals and pseudodifferential operators acting between pairs of Sobolev spaces in 1995. In 1989 she showed that multipliers in Bessel potential spaces are traces of multipliers belonging to a certain class of differentiable functions with a weighted mixed norm. A large part of her joint work with Vladimir Maz'ya on the theory of multipliers involves their analytic characterization, trace inequalities and relations between traces and extension of multipliers, relations of Sobolev multipliers and other function spaces, maximal subalgebras of multiplier spaces, estimates of their essential norm and compactness of multipliers.

Linear and non-linear PDEs
Based on her researches on the theory of multipliers, T. Shaposhnikova gave various applications of this theory to the study of solutions to second order linear and quasilinear elliptic partial differential equations and systems of such equations: this was a consequence of the fact that, in several cases, such solutions can be considered as multipliers in certain spaces of differentiable functions on a given domain (1986, 1987). She described the structure of composition operators in spaces of multipliers between Sobolev spaces and gave applications of those results to semilinear elliptic systems of equations (1987). She also showed that multipliers can be naturally suited to deal with the Lp coercivity of the Neumann problem (1989). Various other applications of multipliers, for example to the problem of higher regularity in single and double layer potential theory for Lipschitz domains, to the problem of regularity at the boundary in the -theory of elliptic boundary value problems and to singular integral operators in Sobolev spaces are summarized in the book .

History of mathematics
Her prize winning book on Jacques Hadamard, coauthored with V. Maz'ya, was published in 1998 jointly by the American Mathematical Society and the London Mathematical Society. An earlier work on the same subject was written by her jointly with E. Polishchuk (1990). Her recent activity in this field includes the paper  telling three stories of scientists who were forced to answer a mathematical question under rather trying circumstances.

Translation and editing activity
However, her work is not restricted only to the translation of monographs: for example she translated into Russian a play by Lars Gårding, titled "Mathematics, Life and Death", published the mathematical journal Algebra i Analiz (Алгебра и анализ).

Shaposhnikova began translating fiction while still living in Russia. In the 1970s she translated into Russian "The Voyage of the Dawn Treader", "The Silver Chair" and the "Screwtape Letters" by C. S. Lewis. These translations were impossible to publish due to ideological reasons and were distributed as samizdat: they first appeared as proper publications only in the mid-1990s, with new reprints appearing regularly.

In 2005 she began translating Swedish children's books into Russian. Among them are "Kerstin and I" by Astrid Lindgren, "Mechanical Santa Claus" by Sven Nordqvist and two books of the "Loranga" series by Barbro Lindgren.

Selected publications

.
. 
.
.
.
.
.
.
.
.
.
. An earlier biographic work on Jacques Hadamard written by T. Shaposhnikova jointly with E. Polishchuk.
.
. There are also two revised and expanded editions: the French translation , and the (further revised and expanded) Russian translation 
.
.
. The "Thuréusföredrag hållet vid prisutdelningsceremonin i Gustavianum" i.e. the Thuréus speech prof. T. Shaposhnikova gave on 31 August 2010 on the occasion of the ceremony for the 2010 prizes awarding by the Royal Society of Sciences in Uppsala. Published in the Society's yearbook, it includes a biography and a description of her research work, which motivated the award: the main theme of the speech though, as the title says (its English translation reads as:-"Jacques Hadamard – A universal mathematician and Renaissance man"), is a biographical sketch of Jacques Hadamard.

See also
Function space
Multiplier (operator theory)
Partial differential equation
Potential theory
Sobolev space

Notes

References

Biographical references
. The document on the founding of the committee at the Home page of the European Mathematical Society, including a list of the former members.
. A list of the winners of the Verdaguer Prize in PDF format, including short motivations for the awarding.
.
. The "Presentation of prizes and awards" speech given by the Secretary of the Royal Society of Sciences in Uppsala, written in the "yearbook 2010", on the occasion of the awarding of the Society prizes to prof. T. Shaposhnikova and to other 2010 winners.

References pertaining to her work
.
.
.

.
.
.
.
.
.
 (also published with ).
.

.

20th-century Russian mathematicians
21st-century Russian mathematicians
Mathematical analysts
PDE theorists
Saint Petersburg State University alumni
Soviet mathematicians
Soviet women mathematicians
Living people
1946 births
20th-century women mathematicians
21st-century women mathematicians
Academic staff of Linköping University